Fines may refer to:
Fines, Andalusia, Spanish municipality
Fine (penalty)
 Fine, a dated term for a premium on a lease of land, a large sum the tenant pays to commute (lessen) the rent throughout the term
Fines, ore or other products with a small particle size

People with the surname
Clarence Fines, Canadian public servant
Gordon Fines, Canadian politician

See also
Fine (disambiguation)
Finings, a product of winemaking
Ad Fines (disambiguation), Roman settlements
Fiennes
Fynes